Steve Wall is a musician, singer, songwriter and actor. He is a founder member of the multi-platinum selling Irish band The Stunning and also The Walls.

As an actor Steve is known for roles in the western mini TV series The English (2022); Ridley Scott's Raised by Wolves (2020); The Witcher (2020); Vikings; Moone Boy; The South Westerlies (2020); and also Rebellion (2016). He played the jazz musician Chet Baker in My Foolish Heart (2018), a Dutch feature film about the trumpeter’s last days in Amsterdam.

Early life 
Stephen Patrick Wall was born in Kingsbury Hospital, Honeypot Lane, the first of five children of Patricia (née Keogh) of the Liberties, Dublin and Vincent Wall of Ennistymon, Co. Clare. Four of the children were born in London and while still young, the family moved back to Ireland, living first with the Keogh family in Harolds Cross. He has two brothers Joseph and Vincent (born in Co. Clare) and two sisters Anna and Helen. His mother’s family home was full of records and sing-songs were regular, with uncles and aunts singing everything from Cole Porter to The Beatles and Ella Fitzgerald. This is where Wall says he discovered his love of music.

Education 
Wall attended several schools in Dublin - St. Louis Junior School, Rathmines, St. Joseph’s National School Terenure and Templeogue College Secondary School, where he left after the first year as the family moved to Ennistymon, Co. Clare when he was thirteen. He spent his teenage years in Ennistymon and attended the Christian Brothers school there. Following that he went to the Galway Regional Technical College, where he joined a new wave band called New Testament as guitarist.

Career

Acting

While still at school in the west of Ireland Wall developed an interest in acting and cinema in particular and applied unsuccessfully to the main London drama schools. When college band New Testament went their separate ways in 1984 Wall approached the Druid Theatre Company, Galway for work. He had a small walk-on part in the 1984 production of Tom Murphy’s On the Outside directed by Paul Brennan. He spent two years at Druid working as a trainee actor, stage assistant and sound operator, working on shows Conversations on a Homecoming and ‘Tis Pity She’s a Whore He then moved to Dublin to pursue an acting career but after an unsuccessful year of finding work he decided to turn back to music and formed The Stunning in 1987. He still performs today with The Stunning and The Walls.

He returned to acting in 2010 by attending acting workshops in The Factory, Dublin, now known as Bow Street Acting Academy. He scored his first role as Uncle Danny in the series Moone Boy for Sky TV and then went on to land parts in other TV series such as Vikings, Warrior, The Witcher, Raised by Wolves, Tin Star, The South Westerlies. He landed the role of Chet Baker in the Dutch arthouse feature film My Foolish Heart about the jazz legends final days in Amsterdam where he died in 1988. Wall’s most recent credit is the 2022 western mini-series The English featuring Emily Blunt and Chaske Spencer, in which he plays the cowboy Thin Kelly.

He has also done voiceover work.

Music

Wall formed The Stunning in Galway in 1987. The band was hugely successful in Ireland with number one albums and top ten singles. Frustrated at not getting their music released internationally despite success at home, the band broke up in 1994. The following year, Wall and his brother Joe formed The Walls. They signed to Columbia Records in 1996 and relocated to London, spending two years there before moving to Dublin in 1998 and starting their own label Earshot Records later changing it to Dirtbird Records. They released three critically acclaimed albums on their own label -  Hi-Lo (2000), New Dawn Breaking (2005), Stop the Lights (2012) as well as EP’s and singles including the top ten hit To the Bright and Shining Sun and Drowning Pool  which featured in the movie Begin Again. The band toured extensively and opened for acts such as U2, Red Hot Chilli Peppers, Bob Dylan, Crowded House.

In 2003 The Stunning reformed in order to promote the re-issue of the bands debut album Paradise in the Picturehouse on their own Dirtbird Records label. The resulting tour was a huge success, sending the album to the top of the charts again almost ten years later.  In 2017 they released Brighten up my Life, their first new single in 24 years. This was followed by the album ‘Twice Around the World’ which peaked at number ten in the Irish mainstream album charts  and number one in the independent charts on 23 March 2018. The Stunning continue to play live today, while Steve and Joe sometimes perform as a two-piece as The Walls.

In April 2021 Wall collaborated with Clare-based musician Simon O’Reilly on a song called Rise with the Sun. During the pandemic, the two collaborated on the song by sharing files online, with O'Reilly recording the music and mixing the song in his studio near Lahinch, Co. Clare and Steve recording vocals and some extra instrumentation in Dublin.

Filmography
 The English, 2022
 Tin Star, 2020
 The South Westerlies, 2020
 Raised by Wolves, 2020
 Here Are the Young Men (feature film)  2020
 Rig 45 2020
 The Witcher, 2019
 Warrior, 2019
 The Hole in the Ground (feature film)  2019
 My Foolish Heart, (feature film) 2018
 An Klondike/Dominion Creek, 2015-2017
 Vikings, 2014-2016
 Rebellion,2016
 Crossing Lines, 2015
 Moone Boy, 2012-2015
 Silent Witness, 2015
 Anywhere But Here (short film) 2014
 Ghost Train (short film) 2013 
 Dark Touch (feature film) 2013
 Gaybo's Grumpy Men, 2005 (self)
 Country, (feature film) 2000
 Detour (short film) 1994

Narration 
 The Irish Mob (TV mini series) 2000

References

External links 
 
 The Stunning discography at Discogs
 The Walls discography at Discogs
 

Irish singer-songwriters
Irish television actors
Irish film actors
Year of birth missing (living people)
Living people